Within statistical factor analysis, the factor regression model, or hybrid factor model, is a special multivariate model with the following form:

where,

 is the -th  (known) observation.

 is the -th sample  (unknown) hidden factors.

 is the (unknown) loading matrix of the  hidden factors.

 is the -th sample  (known) design factors.

 is the (unknown) regression coefficients of the design factors.

 is a vector of (unknown) constant term or intercept.

 is a vector of (unknown) errors, often white Gaussian noise.

Relationship between factor regression model, factor model and regression model 
The factor regression model can be viewed as a combination of factor analysis model and regression model.

Alternatively, the model can be viewed as a special kind of factor model, the hybrid factor model 

Software 
Open source software to perform factor regression is available.

References

Factor analysis
Latent variable models
Regression models